Larry Bell may refer to:

Larry Bell (architect), American architect and professor at the University of Houston
Larry Bell (artist) (born 1939), contemporary artist based in Los Angeles, California and Taos, New Mexico
Larry Bell, founder of Bell's Brewery
Larry Gene Bell (1949–1996), double murderer in Lexington County, South Carolina
Larry M. Bell (born 1939), Democratic member of the North Carolina General Assembly
Larry Thomas Bell (born 1952), American composer, pianist and music professor

See also
Lawrence Bell (disambiguation)